Ingrid Falk (born 1960 in Sweden) is a painter, installation artist and curator. In 1992 formed the art collective FA+ in collaboration with her husband, Gustavo Aguerre.  Amongst the artists who have worked with FA+ are Nicola Pellegrini, Otonella Mocellin, Daniel Wetter and Lennie Lee.
Together Ingrid Falk and Gustavo Aguerre have worked on a number of site-specific installations throughout Europe. These involve large-scale installations, photographic projections, sculptures and video installations. Falk has exhibited in a number of important museums and private galleries throughout Europe.  Ingrid Falk and Gustavo Aguerre assembled 3,053 pieces of toast into a large mosaic of a toaster in late 1999—they are attributed with spreading toast as an art medium.

Exhibitions

Italian Pavilion at the Venice Biennale in 1999
Malmö Art Museum in 1996
ARCO in 2000
The Museo Nacional de Bellas Artes in Buenos Aires, 2000. Two site installations: The Toaster and Pax Securitas 
Konstnärshuset, Stockholm
Stenersen Museum, Oslo
Tirana Biennale, 2001 
Reykjavik Art Museum in 2002
National Center of Contemporary Art in 2005

References

1960 births
Living people
20th-century Swedish photographers
21st-century Swedish photographers
20th-century Swedish women artists
21st-century Swedish women artists
20th-century women photographers
21st-century women photographers
Swedish women photographers
Swedish contemporary artists